1N4DL01D81C212547 is the VIN of a blue 2001 Nissan Altima GXE rental car belonging to Alamo Rent a Car, that was found in the Portland International Jetport parking lot following the September 11, 2001, attacks.  It was issued a Massachusetts license plate 3335 VI.

While it was initially reported that Adnan and Ameer Bukhari had rented and driven the car, the accepted story is now that Mohamed Atta rented the car, although later reports continued to suggest that Adnan Bukhari fell under suspicion because of documents found within the car.

The car had been rented from the Logan International Airport terminal in Boston, Massachusetts, by Atta at 6:08pm Sunday, September 9.  He provided his address of 10001 W Atlantic Boulevard in Coral Springs, Florida, where he is believed to have stayed in room #122.  He listed his phone number as 954-815-3004, a number also associated with Fayez Banihammad.  He used his Visa card ending in 7778 to pay for the rental.

According to the Associated Press story on September 13, the same Boston terminal had also rented Atta the Mitsubishi sedan seized at Logan Airport.

Atta is thought to have picked up Abdulaziz al-Omari on September 10, and the two of them drove it to a Comfort Inn in South Portland, Maine, where they spent the night in room 233. At 8:31pm, the car was photographed with two occupants at a KeyBank drive-thru ATM at 445 Gorham Road in South Portland.

According to parking receipts found in the car, it arrived at the Portland International Jetport at 5:40am on September 11, and was parked on the first level.  After checking in at 5:43, and passing security and an X-ray machine at 5:45, Atta and Omari are believed to have taken the 6:20 Colgan Air Flight 5930 to Boston.

Officials became aware of the car around 11pm on September 11, and by 3:30am on September 12, the car was the subject of a search warrant issued to FBI agent James Lechner, and taken by a flatbed truck to a crime lab in Augusta, Maine.  The warrant was sealed until October 4.

Contents of car 

While it was not listed in the search warrant's findings, a cigarette butt was reported to have been removed from the car separately, and taken directly to a crime lab.

References 

September 11 attacks
Logan International Airport
Mohamed Atta
Nissan Altima
American Airlines Flight 11